Durgapur (also referred to as Susang Durgapur) is an upazila of the Netrokona District in the Mymensingh Division of Bangladesh.

Geography
It has 32,245 households and a total land area of 293.42 km2. It is bounded by Meghalaya state of India on the north, Netrokona sadar and Purbadhala upazilas on the south, Kalmakanda upazila on the east, Dhobaura upazila on the west. The Garo hills and valleys are on the northern part of the upazila.

Demographics
According to 2011 Bangladesh census, Durgapur had a population of 224,873. Males constituted 49.67% of the population and females 50.33%. Muslims formed 90.10% of the population, Hindus 5.87%, Christians 3.89%, and others 0.14%. Durgapur had a literacy rate of 39.52% for the population 7 years and above.

At the 1991 Bangladesh census, Durgapur had a population of 169,135, of whom 83,795 were aged 18 or older. Males constituted 50.49% of the population, and females 49.51%. Durgapur had an average literacy rate of 23% (7+ years), compared to the national average of 32.4%.

Composition of Durgapur Thana
Total Households: 8,250

1.  Bangali;
Total Village: 48;
Total Household: 4,778;
Language Practiced: Bengali;
Religion Practiced: Islam;

2. Banai;
Total Village: 1;
Total Household: 6;
Language Practiced: Banai;
Religion Practiced: Hinduism;

3. Buna / Buno;
Total Village: 3;
Total Household: 37;
Language Practiced: Bengali;
Religion Practiced: Hinduism;
Buna / Buno in Other Districts: Dhaka, Gazipur, Mymensingh, Rajbari, Sherpur, Tangail, Bagerhat, Jessore, Jhenaidah, Khulna, Kushtia, Magura, Satkhira, Bogra, Dinajpur, Joypurhat, Naogaon, Natore, Nilphamari, Pabna, Rajshahi, Sirajganj, Maulvibazar;

4. Garo;
Number of Villages they lived with bangali: 10;
Total Household: 924;
Language Practiced: Achik / Garo (98.08%), Deal (1.92%);
Religion Practiced: Christianity (99.96%), Shangsharik (0.04%);
Garo lived in Other Districts: Sherpur, Mymensingh, Banderban, Chittagong,

5. Hajong;
Number of Villages they lived with bangali: 08;
Total Household: 505;
Language Practiced: Hajong;
Religion Practiced: Hinduism;
Hajong in Other Districts: Mymensingh, Sherpur, Sunamganj;

The city's area is 293.42 sq km It is an ancient town situated on the banks of the river Somessori. This habitation known as a tourist area. There are civil and criminal courts here from British rule regime. 

population Density 710 (per km2) 
literacy in rate in village 31.0% and in town 52.3%
Population of the town 22661 and village 175665

Administration
Durgapur Thana was formed in 1874 and converted into upazila in 1982.

Durgapur Upazila is divided into Durgapur Municipality and seven union parishads: Bakaljora, Birisiri, Chandigarh, Durgapur, Gaokandia, Kakairgara, and Kullagora. The union parishads are subdivided into 129 mauzas and 210 villages.

Durgapur Municipality is subdivided into 9 wards and 30 mahallas.

Notable residents
Mustaque Ahmed Ruhi - Former Member of 9th National Parliament of 157th constituency which included this area.

Points of interest

Transport
Over last 10 years, Durgapur has become a famous tourist spot. The most common transport used to visit Durgapur is bus or train. Every night at 11.50 PM, a train named Haor Express leaves Dhaka for Netrokona.

Direct bus from Dhaka to Durgapur is available from Dhaka Mohakhali Inter City Bus Terminal, it usually takes 5 hours to reach Durgapur by bus. The roads of Durgapur are highly damaged as innumerable trucks filled with wet sand from the Someshwari river travel them without following proper protocol.

Gallery

See also
Upazilas of Bangladesh
Districts of Bangladesh
Divisions of Bangladesh

References

Upazilas of Netrokona District
Mymensingh